Cerithideopsis costata is a species of small sea snail, a marine gastropod mollusk in the family Potamididae.

Distribution
This marine species occurs in the Caribbean Sea and the Gulf of Mexico.

Description 
The maximum recorded shell length is 21 mm.

Habitat 
The species has been found in water at recorded depths from 0 to 402 m.<

References

 Reid D.G. & Claremont M. (2014) The genus Cerithideopsis Thiele, 1929 (Gastropoda: Potamididae) in the Indo-West Pacific region. Zootaxa 3779(1): 61–80

External links
 Da Costa, Mendes E. (1778). Historia naturalis testaceorum Britanniæ, or, the British conchology; containing the descriptions and other particulars of natural history of the shells of Great Britain and Ireland: illustrated with figures. In English and French. – Historia naturalis testaceorum Britanniæ, ou, la conchologie Britannique; contenant les descriptions & autres particularités d'histoire naturelle des coquilles de la Grande Bretagne & de l'Irlande: avec figures en taille douce. En anglois & françois., i–xii, 1–254, i–vii, [1], Pl. I-XVII. London. (Millan, White, Emsley & Robson)
 Michaud A. L. G. (1829). Description de plusieurs espèces nouvelles de coquilles vivantes. Bulletin d'Histoire Naturelle de la Société Linnéenne de Bordeaux 3: 260–276, 1 pl
 Montagu, G. (1808). Supplement to Testacea Britannica with Additional Plates. Woolmer, Exeter. v + 183 pp., pl. 17–30

Potamididae
Gastropods described in 1778
Taxa named by Emanuel Mendes da Costa